Manny Lehman may refer to:
 Manny Lehman (disc jockey), house music DJ and producer
 Manny Lehman (computer scientist) (1925–2010), professor of computer science